Ingvarda Røberg (5 June 1895 - 25 August 1990) was a Norwegian politician for the Labour Party.

She served as a deputy representative to the Norwegian Parliament from Bergen during the term 1958–1961.

References

1895 births
1990 deaths
Labour Party (Norway) politicians
Deputy members of the Storting
Politicians from Bergen
Women members of the Storting
20th-century Norwegian women politicians
20th-century Norwegian politicians